Jamiatul Falah Mosque or Baitul Falah is the largest mosque in Chittagong, Bangladesh, able to hold 5,000 worshipers.

It is located on the south side of WASA Square. To the east of the mosque is a large eidgah that is commonly the location of two of the three largest Eid al-Fitr and Eid al-Adha gatherings in the city.

The mosque is maintained by the Chittagong City Corporation. As of 2021, the khatib of the mosque is Syed Mohammad Abu Taleb Alauddin Al-Kaderi.

See also
 List of mosques in Bangladesh

References

Mosques in Chittagong